Helgrind may refer to:
Helgrind, the main entrance to Hel in Norse mythology
Helgrind, a part of the computer programming tool Valgrind
Helgrind, a mountain in the Inheritance cycle